Matthew Cullen may refer to:

Matthew Cullen (bishop), in Ireland
Matthew Cullen (miner), of Cullen Hotel and Keyser–Cullen House, Utah, USA

See also
Mathew Cullen, video and film director
Cullen (disambiguation)